Harry Melling may refer to:
Harry Melling (NASCAR owner) (1945–1999), Winston Cup car owner
Harry Melling (actor) (born 1989), British actor who plays Dudley Dursley in the Harry Potter films